is a railway station on the Senzan Line in Aoba-ku, Sendai in Miyagi Prefecture, Japan, operated by East Japan Railway Company (JR East). The station also uses the moniker .

The kanji characters for Ayashi are the same characters as in the name Aiko given to the daughter of the Crown Prince of Japan. When she was born on December 1, 2001, over a thousand people came to the station to purchase platform tickets as a commemorative souvenir. From April to November 2001, only 124 tickets were sold at the station but from December 7 to December 28, 2001, about 84,000 tickets were sold at the station. JR East began selling commemorative tickets on January 1, 2002, to honor the event showing the station. Each ticket was stamped with the station name and date of purchase automatically.

Lines

Station layout
The station has one side platform and one island platform connected to the station building by a footbridge. The station has a "Midori no Madoguchi" staffed ticket office.

Platforms

History

The station opened on 29 September 1929. The station was absorbed into the JR East network upon the privatization of Japanese National Railways (JNR) on 1 April 1987.

Passenger statistics
In fiscal 2018, the station was used by an average of 4,184 passengers daily (boarding passengers only).

Surrounding area
  Ayashi Daibutsu, Bukkokuji

See also
 List of railway stations in Japan

References

External links

 

Stations of East Japan Railway Company
Railway stations in Sendai
Senzan Line
Railway stations in Japan opened in 1929